{{Infobox officeholder
| image               = Joker Arroyo.jpg
| name                = Joker P. Arroyo
| imagesize           = 
| caption             = 
| office              = Senator of the Philippines
| office2             = Member of thePhilippine House of Representativesfrom Makati
| predecessor2        = District established
| successor2          = Teodoro Locsin Jr.
| constituency2       = 1st district
| term_start3         = June 30, 1992
| term_end3           = June 30, 1998
| predecessor3        = Maria Consuelo Puyat-Reyes
| successor3          = District dissolved
| constituency3       = Lone district
| office4             = 22nd Executive Secretary of the Philippines{{small| (Presidential Executive Assistant -1986)}}
| term_start4         = February 25, 1986
| term_end4           = September 15, 1987
| president4          = Corazon Aquino
| predecessor4        = Juan Tuvera
| successor4          = Catalino Macaraig Jr.
| birth_name          = Ceferino Paz Arroyo, Jr.
| birth_date          = 
| birth_place         = Naga, Camarines Sur,  Philippine Islands
| death_date          = 
| death_place         = San Francisco, California, United States
| nationality         = Filipino
| party               = Independent (1992–2001, 2002–2007, 2014–2015)
| otherparty          = Lakas–CMD (2008–2014)KAMPI (2007–2008)Aksyon Demokratiko (2001–2002)Lakas–NUCD (2001)
| spouse              = Odelia Gregorio  Felicitas Aquino
| relations           = 
| children            = 
| residence           = Makati
| alma_mater          = Ateneo de Manila University (AA)University of the Philippines Diliman (LL.B)
| profession          = Lawyer
| website             = Senate Profile
| termstart           = June 30, 2001
| termend             = June 30, 2013
| office1             = Chair of the Senate Blue Ribbon Committee
| termstart1          = July 23, 2001
| termend1            = June 30, 2007
| termstart2          = June 30, 1998
| termend2            = June 30, 2001
| predecessor1        = Aquilino Pimentel Jr.
| successor1          = Alan Peter Cayetano
| honorific_prefix    = The Honourable
}}
Ceferino "Joker" Paz Arroyo Jr. (January 5, 1927 – October 5, 2015) was a Filipino statesman and key figure in the 1986 EDSA People Power Revolution which ousted dictator Ferdinand Marcos. He was a Congressman for Makati from 1992 to 2001 and Senator from 2001 to 2013. Arroyo received various awards and commendations for his significant contributions to the law profession and public service. Among these are the Philippine Bar Association's Most Distinguished Award for Justice as a “man beholden to no one except to his country” and Senate Resolution No. 100 enacted in the 8th Congress citing his invaluable service to the Filipino people. He was also known for being the thriftiest legislator, earning the title of "Scrooge of Congress", as he only had few staff members without bodyguards and did not use his pork barrel funds. In 2018, Arroyo was identified by the Human Rights Victims' Claims Board as a Motu Proprio human rights violations victim of the Martial Law Era.

Early life
Joker Arroyo was born on January 5, 1927, in Naga, Camarines Sur to Ceferino Barrameda Arroyo, Sr. (1884–1949) and Eusebia Bance Paz (1898–1949). His parents were married on April 23, 1919, in Naga, Camarines Sur. He has seven siblings, including Zeferino "Tong", Jack (a former vice governor of Camarines Sur), and Nonito, from Baao, Camarines Sur. His name "Joker," as well as his siblings', was derived from his father's fondness for card playing.Toms, S. "The Philippine name game", BBC News, January 14, 2006. Retrieved February 21, 2007.

Education
He completed his elementary education at the Naga Central School I in Naga, Camarines Sur and secondary education at the Camarines Sur National High School also in Naga City. He obtained his Associate of Arts in Public Law at the Ateneo de Manila University (pre-law). In 1952, his Bachelor of Laws from the UP College of Law at the University of the Philippines Diliman. He is a member of the Upsilon Sigma Phi fraternity, batch 1948.

Career

As a lawyer
He started his professional career as lawyer in 1953. Most of his clients belonged to the middle class and low income families.

On September 23, 1972, President Ferdinand Marcos declared Proclamation 1081, placing the entire Philippines under Martial Law. Arroyo was the very first lawyer to challenge the act before the Supreme Court and questioned its legality under the 1935 Philippine Constitution.

Arroyo and other lawyers joined in questioning other Marcos' acts before the Supreme Court: 1) the ratification of the Marcos-dictated 1973 Constitution; 2) Amendment Six that empowered President Marcos to exercise lawmaking powers alongside the Batasang Pambansa; 3) the power of military tribunals to try civilians.  These protestations did not stop Marcos' consolidation of power at the time, but showed that not all leading Filipinos were fully supportive of him.

Arroyo participated in the trials of political detainees such as Senator Benigno Aquino Jr., ABS-CBN Executive Eugenio Lopez, Jr., Cebu politician Sergio Osmeña III, Communist Party of the Philippines founder and University of the Philippines Professor Jose Maria Sison, Senators Jovito Salonga and Eva Kalaw, lawyers Aquilino Pimentel Jr., Renato Tañada, Eduardo Olaguer and many others.

Arroyo actively participated in street demonstrations. He was gassed, injured and hospitalized during protest rallies and incarcerated in a military stockade. He was one of the founders of the civic group Movement for the Advancement of the Brotherhood, Integrity, Nationalism and Independence (MABINI) and the Free Legal Assistance Group (FLAG).

When Corazon Aquino decided to challenge Ferdinand Marcos in the 1986 Snap Presidential Election, Arroyo served as counsel for Aquino during the snap election. During the first EDSA Revolution, he served as one Aquino's key advisers.

Political career

As Executive Secretary
Arroyo was appointed as the Presidential Executive Assistant, later reverted as Executive Secretary, and he was one of the first appointees of Corazon Aquino after she was inaugurated in Club Filipino in San Juan. Arroyo served as Aquino's alter ego in her issuance of Executive Orders (formerly Presidential Decrees). These include the creation of the Family Code, the Presidential Commission on Good Government, creation of the 1986 Freedom Constitution, and the removal of local government officials loyal to Marcos and appointment of Officers-In-Charge. One Aquino decision, the release of Communist leader Jose Maria Sison, sparked the September 1987 coup attempt initiated by rebel military leaders. Due to intense pressure from the Philippine Congress in the following months, Aquino accepted Arroyo's resignation.Chua-Eoan, H. "The Philippines The Joker Was Not Laughing", Time p. 2, September 21, 1987. Retrieved February 21, 2007.

Aside from being Executive Secretary, he became Chairman of the Philippine National Bank and as Executive Director for the Philippines in the Asian Development Bank from 1986 to 1990.

Arroyo has received various awards and commendations for his significant contributions to the law profession and public service. Among these are the Philippine Bar Association's Most Distinguished Award for Justice as a “man beholden to no one except to his country” and a Senate Resolution No. 100 enacted in the 8th Congress commending him for his invaluable services to the Filipino people.

As Congressman
Arroyo ran independent for the position of Congressman in the lone district of Makati in 1992. He was a popular figure in the House of Representatives with a 100% attendance record for nine years from the time he was elected up to the end of his last term. He was in caucus with the PDP–Laban. He passed several national bills and some local bills like the creation of the City of Makati and the second district of Makati. When the lone district of Makati was divided into two, he ran for the first district in 1998.

In November 2000, he was one of the last congressmen to sign the endorsement for the impeachment of President Joseph Estrada. He was voted the Lead Prosecutor for the impeachment trial in December 2000. He fought for the opening of the second bank envelope and its presentation was a critical evidence for the prosecution of Estrada. The Senate voted down his request and this led to the second EDSA Revolution. His role in the impeachment trial earned him one of preferred choices in the SWS and Pulse Asia survey for a Senate race. The new government, led by President Gloria Macapagal Arroyo convinced Congressman Arroyo to run for the Senate. He was named to the People Power Coalition's senatorial slate. Arroyo received a huge number of votes from the electorate.

As Senator
Arroyo has chaired the Senate Blue Ribbon Committee, the Senate Justice and Human Rights Committee, and the Senate Public Services Committee, during the 13th Congress. He claimed to have never traveled abroad on government money and his Statement of Assets and Liabilities has remained almost unchanged from the time he entered public service in 1986. retrieved on February 21, 2007. He was reelected in 2007 under the administration TEAM Unity coalition. He retired from public service on June 30, 2013.

Personal life
Joker Arroyo was married twice. His first wife was Gregg Shoes entrepreneur Odelia Gregorio. Their eldest daughter is Ma. Antonia Odelia “Maoi” Gregorio Arroyo, CEO of Hybridigm Consulting, the first biotechnology commercialization firm in the Philippines. Maoi was hailed by Entrepreneur Magazine'' as one of the top 35 entrepreneurs under 35 in the Philippines. His second daughter, Ma. Zef Francisca "Baba" Arroyo, is an entrepreneur, artist, and pastry chef. His second wife was successful lawyer Felicitas S. Aquino, a member of the 1986 Constitutional Commission. Their daughter is Joker's namesake and a champion equestrian, whose career highlights include a team gold medal for the Philippines at the 2005 Southeast Asian Games, among many other medal performances with the Philippine team. The younger Joker has graduated from the British School Manila in 2006, and Yale University in 2010.

Although they have the same surname, Joker Arroyo is not related to former President Gloria Macapagal Arroyo and her husband Jose Miguel Arroyo.

Death
Arroyo died on October 5, 2015, in San Francisco, California after an unsuccessful heart surgery. He was 88.

References

External links
 Senate of the Philippines - Joker Arroyo
 
 

1927 births
2015 deaths
People from Makati
People from Naga, Camarines Sur
Bicolano people
20th-century Filipino lawyers
Senators of the 15th Congress of the Philippines
Senators of the 14th Congress of the Philippines
Senators of the 13th Congress of the Philippines
Senators of the 12th Congress of the Philippines
Ateneo de Manila University alumni
University of the Philippines alumni
Members of the House of Representatives of the Philippines from Makati
Executive Secretaries of the Philippines
Aksyon Demokratiko politicians
Lakas–CMD politicians
Bicolano politicians
Corazon Aquino administration cabinet members
People from Baao, Camarines Sur